Nora Picciotto, formerly Baroness Nora Bentinck and Nora Czartoryski (born Eleonora Picciotto on 9 September 1942, Cairo) is the first wife of Prince Adam Karol Czartoryski, mother of Princess Tamara Czartoryska.

Nora Picciotto was born on 9 September 1942 in Cairo, Kingdom of Egypt, daughter of Ferdinand Picciotto, and Edith Rothenberg, both of Jewish origin, born in Cairo, Egypt. She worked in the film industry as a public relations specialist and also a model. She first married Iranian Manoucher Khanlari and had two children Yasmine Khanlari born on 29 April 1962 and Fabrizio David Ali Khanlari born on 3 December 1965. On 25 January 1977 she married her second husband Prince Adam Karol Czartoryski and gave birth to their daughter Princess Tamara on 23 April 1978. The marriage with Prince Adam Karol ended in divorce on 28 April 1986. Her third marriage was to Baron Steven Charles John Bentinck born 1957 (otherwise known as Carel Johannes Baron Bentinck), grandson of the industrialist and art collector Heinrich, Baron Thyssen-Bornemisza de Kászon), nephew of Baron Hans Heinrich Thyssen-Bornemisza (1921–2002). They had no children, and their marriage ended in divorce in 1996.

References

1942 births
Living people
Royalty from Cairo
Egyptian Jews